The Museo Archeologico di Monasterace (Monasterace Archeological Museum) is a museum in Monasterace, southern Italy. It houses a collection of finds from the ancient Greek city Caulonia, of which the archaeological site is located close to the museum.

Gallery 

Magna Grecia
Monasterace
Vallata dello Stilaro
Art of Magna Graecia
Museums in Calabria
History of Calabria